The South West African Native Labour Association (SWANLA) was a labour recruitment organisation which recruited primarily Ovambo people from Ovamboland in northern Namibia to work in the diamond mines in Namibia's southern ǁKaras Region. It was infamous for its use of contract labour and human rights abuses among those employed in the mines. It was established in 1943 during World War II to accommodate a rising demand for labour. SWANLA was a driving force in the creation of opposition political movements, including future liberation movement and ruling party of Namibia South West Africa People's Organization (SWAPO).

See also
 Witwatersrand Native Labour Association

References

1943 establishments in South West Africa
ǁKaras Region
Ovambo
Mining in Namibia
Employment agencies
Organizations established in 1943